Paul-Ferdinand Gachet (30 July 1828 – 9 January 1909) was a French physician most famous for treating the painter Vincent van Gogh during his last weeks in Auvers-sur-Oise. Gachet was a great supporter of artists and the Impressionist movement. He was an amateur painter, signing his works "Paul van Ryssel", referring to his birthplace: Rijsel is the Dutch name of Lille.

Biography
He was born and raised in Lille. His family moved to Mechelen, where Gachet's father was transferred to in 1844/1845 to start a new branch of the firm he was working for.

While a student at the University of Paris, he learnt drawing in his spare time, and collected paintings by Gustave Courbet and Édouard Manet. After gaining his BA degree, he worked at the mental hospitals of Bicêtre and Salpêtrière. His teachers included Armand Trousseau. In 1858 he received a medical degree for his thesis Étude sur la Mélancolie (Éditeur du Montpellier Médecal).

He returned to Paris and set up a private homeopathic practice. Gachet married Blanche Castets in 1868. Their daughter, Margueritte Clémentine Elisa was born in 1869. There he continued his medical practice, but also associated with artists such as Camille Pissarro, Armand Guillaumin, Victor Vignon, and Paul Cézanne, Cézanne helping him establish his own studio in his attic.

Gachet also knew Gustave Courbet, Champfleury and Victor Hugo. He was a friend of the chemist Henri Nestlé and prescribed Nestlé's new powdered milk supplement to some of his child patients. Under the pen-name Blanche de Mézin, he published books in medicine and art-criticism.

He spent much time with Charles Méryon after the etcher's committal to Charenton.  He oversaw Auguste Renoir's recovery from pneumonia in 1882. He advised Édouard Manet against the amputation of his leg. However, Manet did not follow this advice.

Gachet's tomb is situated in section 52 of Père Lachaise Cemetery in Paris.

Gachet and Vincent van Gogh

Vincent van Gogh suffered from a mental disorder and was sent to an asylum on 8 May 1889. He then was released from the asylum in May 1890, but continuation of treatment was required, which included Van Gogh being under supervision. Vincent's brother, Theo van Gogh, thought that Gachet's background and sensitivity toward artists would make him an ideal doctor for Vincent during his recovery. Very soon after he began seeing Gachet, however, Vincent began to doubt the doctor's usefulness. Vincent described Gachet as: "sicker than I am, I think, or shall we say just as much". However, after a while of meeting up with Gachet, Van Gogh's opinion of him improved. Van Gogh found a friend in him; he mentions that he wasn't only a muse but also a caretaker. "Vincent alternately wrote of the doctor, 'I have found in him a complete friend, even something like a new brother, ... ' ".

Gachet has been the subject of criticism over the years regarding Van Gogh's suicide after ten weeks of consultation.  However, Van Gogh was either unable or unwilling to follow his doctor's advice to cut back on alcohol and smoking. According to van Gogh biographer Wilfred Arnold, "there was not much else available to any physician of the day which could have reversed the course of Vincent's illness," and he summarizes the medical treatment that Van Gogh received from his various doctors thus: "The overall assessment is rather that they did as well as expected with an unfamiliar disease and a difficult patient."

Subject in art
Gachet was friends with and treated Pissarro, Renoir, Manet, Cézanne and Goeneutte, to name just a few. He had amassed one of the largest impressionist art collections in Europe before he died in 1909. Gachet, his wife and his home were the subjects of several pieces of art by celebrated artists including:

Portrayals
Everett Sloane played Gachet in Vincente Minnelli’s Lust for Life.

Gachet is prominently featured in Maurice Pialat's 1991 film Van Gogh where he is played by Gérard Séty.

Mathieu Amalric plays Gachet in Julian Schnabel's At Eternity's Gate, which depicts van Gogh (Willem Dafoe) painting Gachet's portrait in one scene.

Jerome Flynn plays Gachet in the 2017 film Loving Vincent'' (notable for being animated entirely through oil paintings in van Gogh's style), in a scene where he discusses his own role in Vincent's final days.

In popular culture
"Dr. Gachet", a song written and sung by Rod MacDonald in 1997, tells the painting's history and notes "the painting Van Gogh couldn't sell / has become too valuable / for anyone to ever see again."

References

External links

  Biographical note by Jacqueline Sonolet and Paul Gachet's works digitized  by the BIUM (Bibliothèque interuniversitaire de médecine et d'odontologie, Paris), see its digital library Medic@.

1828 births
1909 deaths
People from Lille
Physicians from Mechelen
French art collectors
19th-century French painters
French male painters
20th-century French painters
20th-century French male artists
Burials at Père Lachaise Cemetery
19th-century French physicians
French homeopaths
19th-century French male artists